Ming Prefecture or Mingzhou may refer to:

 Ming Prefecture (Hebei) (洺州), a prefecture between the 6th and 13th centuries
 Mingzhou (Hebei town), the seat of the Hebei prefecture, now Guangfu Ancient City in Handan Prefecture, Hebei
 Ming Prefecture (Zhejiang) (明州), a prefecture between the 8th and 12th centuries
 Mingzhou (Zhejiang town), the seat of the Zhejiang prefecture, now Ningbo, Zhejiang

See also
Ming (disambiguation)